Philip Anthony Richard Hockey (8March 195624January 2013) was a well-known South African ornithologist. He was director of the Percy FitzPatrick Institute of African Ornithology at the University of Cape Town, co-editor of Roberts' Birds of Southern Africa and co-author of Sasol Birds of Southern Africa. Hockey was born in Bournemouth, England in 1956 and moved to South Africa in 1979. His doctoral study was on the African oystercatcher. He focused on shorebirds, writing the book Waders of Southern Africa. Hockey observed 885 different species of birds in Southern Africa.

Books

References 

1956 births
2013 deaths
Academic staff of the University of Cape Town
Alumni of the University of Edinburgh
University of Cape Town alumni
South African ornithologists
Deaths from cancer in South Africa